Dronfield was an Urban District in Derbyshire, England from 1894 to 1974. It was created under the Local Government Act 1894.

It was enlarged in 1935 when parts of the civil parishes of Coal Aston, Dronfield Woodhouse and Unstone were transferred to the district.

The district was abolished in 1974 under the Local Government Act 1972 and combined with Chesterfield Rural District (except the civil parish of Brimington) and Clay Cross Urban District to form the new North East Derbyshire district.

References

Districts of England created by the Local Government Act 1894
Districts of England abolished by the Local Government Act 1972
History of Derbyshire
Urban districts of England